This is a list of films which have placed number one at the weekly box office in Japan during 1994. Amounts are in Yen and are from a sample of key cities.

References

See also
 Lists of box office number-one films

1994
1994 in Japanese cinema
Japan